Rohan is a fictional kingdom of Men in J. R. R. Tolkien's fantasy setting of Middle-earth. Known for its horsemen, the Rohirrim, Rohan provides its ally Gondor with cavalry. Its territory is mainly grassland. The Rohirrim call their land the Mark or the Riddermark, names recalling that of the historical kingdom of Mercia, the region of Western England where Tolkien lived.

Tolkien grounded Rohan in elements inspired by Anglo-Saxon tradition, poetry, and linguistics, specifically in its Mercian dialect, in everything but its use of horses. Tolkien used Old English for the kingdom's language and names, pretending that this was in translation of Rohirric. Meduseld, the hall of King Théoden, is modelled on Heorot, the great hall in Beowulf.

Within the plot of The Lord of the Rings, Rohan plays a critical role in the action—first against the wizard Saruman in the Battle of the Hornburg, then in the climactic Battle of the Pelennor Fields. There, Théoden leads the Rohirrim to victory against the forces of Mordor; he is killed when his horse falls, but his niece Éowyn kills the leader of the Ringwraiths.

In Tolkien's works

Etymology

Tolkien's own account, in an unsent letter, gives both the fictional and the actual etymologies of Rohan:

Geography

In Tolkien's Middle-earth, Rohan is an inland realm. Its countryside is described as a land of pastures and lush tall grassland which is frequently windswept. The meadows contain "many hidden pools, and broad acres of sedge waving above wet and treacherous bogs" that water the grasses. The cartographer Karen Wynn Fonstad calculated Rohan to be 52,763 square miles (136,656 km2) in area (slightly larger than England).

Borders

Rohan is bordered to the north by the Fangorn forest, home to the Ents (tree-giants) led by Treebeard, and by the great river Anduin, called Langflood by the Rohirrim. To the northeast are the walls of Emyn Muil. After the War of the Ring, the kingdom is extended northwards over the Limlight to the borders of Lothlórien. To the east are the mouths of the River Entwash, and the Mering Stream, which separated Rohan from the Gondorian province of Anórien, known to the Rohirrim as Sunlending. To the south lie the White Mountains (Ered Nimrais). To the west are the rivers Adorn and Isen, where Rohan borders the land of the Dunlendings. To the northwest, just under the southern end of the Misty Mountains, lies the walled circle of Isengard around the ancient tower of Orthanc; at the time of the War of the Ring, it had been taken over by the evil wizard Saruman. The area of the western border where the Misty Mountains and the White Mountains drew near to each other is known as the Gap of Rohan.

Capital

The capital of Rohan is the fortified town of Edoras, on a hill in a valley of the White Mountains. "Edoras" is Old English for "enclosures". The town of Edoras was built by Rohan's second King, Brego son of Eorl the Young. The hill on which Edoras is built stands in the mouth of the valley of Harrowdale. The river Snowbourn flows past the town on its way east towards the Entwash. The town is protected by a high wall of timber. 

Meduseld, the Golden Hall of the Kings of Rohan, is in the centre of the town at the top of the hill. "Meduseld", Old English for "mead hall", is meant to be a translation of an unknown Rohirric word with the same meaning. Meduseld is based on the mead hall Heorot in Beowulf; it is a large hall with a thatched roof that appears golden from far off. The walls are richly decorated with tapestries depicting the history and legends of the Rohirrim, and it serves as a house for the King and his kin, a meeting hall for the King and his advisors, and a gathering hall for ceremonies and festivities. It is at Meduseld that Aragorn, Gimli, Legolas, and Gandalf meet with King Théoden. Legolas describes Meduseld in a line that directly translates a line of Beowulf, "The light of it shines far over the land", representing líxte se léoma ofer landa fela. The hall is anachronistically described as having louvres to remove the smoke, derived from William Morris's 1889 The House of the Wolfings.

Other settlements

Upstream from Edoras, deeper into Harrowdale, are the hamlets of Upbourn and Underharrow. At the head of Dunharrow (from Old English Dûnhaerg, "the heathen fane on the hillside") is a refuge, Firienfeld, in the White Mountains. Aldburg, capital of the Eastfold, is the original settlement of Eorl the Young. The Hornburg, a major fortress guarding the western region, is in Helm's Deep, a valley in the White Mountains.

Regions

The kingdom of Rohan, also called the Mark, is primarily divided into two regions, the East-mark and the West-mark. They are each led by a marshal of the kingdom. Rohan's capital, Edoras, lies in a small but populous region in the centre south of the kingdom, the Folde. In an earlier concept, Rohan's capital region was called the King's Lands, of which the Folde was a sub-region to the south-east of Edoras. North of the Folde, the boundary between the East-mark and West-mark runs along the Snowbourn River and the Entwash. Most of the rest of Rohan's population is spread along the foothills of the White Mountains in both directions from the Folde. In the West-mark the Westfold extends along the mountains to Helm's Deep (the defensive centre of Westfold) and to the Gap of Rohan. Beyond the Gap of Rohan lies the West Marches, the kingdom's far west borderland. The Eastfold extends along the White Mountains in the opposite direction (and was thus a part of the East-mark). It is bound by the Entwash to the north. Its eastern borderland is called the Fenmarch; beyond this lies the Kingdom of Gondor.

The centre of Rohan is a large plain, divided by the Entwash into the East Emnet and the West Emnet. These regions fell respectively into the East-mark and the West-mark. The northernmost region of Rohan, and the least populous, is the Wold. The Field of Celebrant (named for a synonym of the River Silverlode), even further north, is added to Rohan after the War of the Ring.

Culture

People

The Dúnedain of Gondor and the Rohirrim are distantly related, having descended from the same place. Unlike the inhabitants of Gondor, who are portrayed as enlightened and highly civilized, the Rohirrim are shown as being at a lower level of enlightenment.

The names and many details of Rohirric culture are derived from Germanic cultures, particularly that of the Anglo-Saxons and their Old English language, towards which Tolkien felt a strong affinity. Anglo-Saxon England was defeated by the cavalry of the Normans at the Battle of Hastings, and some Tolkien scholars have suggested that the Rohirrim are Tolkien's wishful version of an Anglo-Saxon society that retained a "rider culture", and would have been able to resist such an invasion. The Tolkien scholar Tom Shippey notes that Tolkien derived the emblem of the House of Éorl, a "white horse upon green", from the Uffington White Horse carved into the grass of the chalk downs in England.

While Tolkien represents the Rohirrim with Anglo-Saxon culture and language, their ancestors are given Gothic attributes. The names of Rhovanion's royal family, (the ancestors of the Rohirrim), include such names as Vidugavia, Vidumavi and Vinitharya, which are of Gothic origin. Vidugavia specifically has been seen as an synonym for Vitiges, king of the Ostrogoths in Italy from 536 to 540. Tolkien saw this as a parallel with the real-world relationship between Old English and Gothic.

In response to a query about clothing styles in Middle-earth, Tolkien wrote:

Horses and warfare

The armies of Rohan were largely horsemen. The basic tactical unit was the éored, Old English for "a unit of cavalry, a troop", which at the time of the War of the Ring had a nominal strength of 120 riders. 

In time of war, every able man was obliged to join the Muster of Rohan. Rohan was bound by the Oath of Éorl to help Gondor in times of peril, and the latter asked for their aid through the giving of the Red Arrow. This has a historical antecedent in the Old English poem Elene, in which Constantine the Great summoned an army of mounted Visigoths to his aid against the Huns by sending an arrow as a "token of war". Gondor could also call the Rohirrim in need by lighting the warning beacons of Gondor, seven  signal fires along the White Mountains from Minas Tirith to the Rohan border: Amon Dîn, Eilenach, Nardol, Erelas, Min-Rimmon, Calenhad and Halifirien.

At the start of the War of the Ring a Full Muster would have been over 12,000 riders. Among the horses of the Rohirrim were the famed mearas, the noblest and fastest horses that ever roamed Arda. It was because of the close affiliation with horses, both in war and peace, that they received their name. Rohirrim (or more properly Rochirrim) is Sindarin for "Horse-lords," and Rohan (or Rochand) means "Land of the Horse-lords".

Language

Tolkien generally called the language simply "the language of Rohan" or "of the Rohirrim". The adjectival form "Rohirric" is common; Tolkien once also used "Rohanese". Like many languages of Men, it is akin to Adûnaic, the language of Númenóreans, and therefore to the Westron or Common Speech.

The Rohirrim called their homeland the Riddermark, a modernization by Tolkien of Old English Riddena-mearc, meaning, according to the Index to The Lord of the Rings, "the border country of the knights"; also Éo-marc, the Horse-mark, or simply the Mark. They call themselves the Éorlingas, the Sons of Éorl. Tolkien rendered the language of the Riders of Rohan, Rohirric, as the Mercian dialect of Old English. Even words and phrases that were printed in modern English showed a strong Old English influence. This solution occurred to Tolkien  when he was searching for an explanation of the Eddaic names of the dwarves already published in The Hobbit. Tolkien, a philologist, with a special interest in Germanic languages, pretended that the names and phrases of Old English were translated from Rohirric, just as the English used in The Shire was supposedly translated from Middle-earth's Westron or Common Speech. Examples include éored and mearas. The Riders' names for the cunningly-built tower of Isengard, Orthanc, and for the Ents, the tree-giants of Fangorn forest, are similarly Old English, both being found in the phrase orþanc enta geweorc, "cunning work of giants" in the poem The Ruin, though Shippey suggests that Tolkien may have chosen to read the phrase also as "Orthanc, the Ent's fortress".

In The Two Towers, chapter 6, the Riders of Rohan are introduced before they are seen, by Aragorn, who chants in the language of the Rohirrim words "in a slow tongue unknown to the Elf and the Dwarf", a lai that Legolas senses "is laden with the sadness of Mortal Men". The song is called the Lament of the Rohirrim. To achieve a resonant sense of the lost past, the now-legendary time of a peaceful alliance of the Horse-lords with the realm of Gondor, Tolkien adapted the short Ubi sunt ("Where are they?") passage of the Old English poem The Wanderer.

"Thus spoke a forgotten poet long ago in Rohan, recalling how tall and fair was Eorl the Young, who rode down out of the North," Aragorn explains, after singing the Lament.

History

Early history
In the 13th century of the Third Age, the Kings of Gondor made close alliances with the Northmen of Rhovanion, a people said in The Lord of the Rings to be akin to the Three Houses of Men (later the Dúnedain) from the First Age. In the 21st century, a remnant tribe of such Northmen, the Éothéod, moved from the valleys of Anduin to the northwest of Mirkwood, disputing with the Dwarves over the treasure-hoard of Scatha the dragon.

In 2509, Cirion the Steward of Gondor summoned the Éothéod to help repel an invasion of Men from Rhûn and Orcs from Mordor. Eorl the Young, lord of the Éothéod, answered the summons, arriving unexpected at a decisive battle on the Field of Celebrant, routing the orc army. As a reward, Éorl was given the Gondorian province of Calenardhon (except for Isengard).

Kingdom of Rohan

Eorl the Young founded the Kingdom of Rohan in the former Calenardhon; the royal family was known as the House of Eorl. The first line of kings lasted for 249 years, until the ninth king Helm Hammerhand died. His sons had been killed earlier, and his nephew Fréaláf Hildeson began the second line of kings, which lasted until the end of the Third Age. The two lines of kings are buried in two lines of grave mounds below the royal hall at Edoras, like those at Gamla Uppsala in Sweden, or Sutton Hoo in England.

In 2758, Rohan was invaded by Dunlendings under Wulf, son of Freca, of mixed Dunland and Rohan blood. The King, Helm Hammerhand, took refuge in the Hornburg until help from Gondor and Dunharrow  arrived a year later. Soon after this Saruman took over Isengard, and was welcomed as an ally.

War of the Ring

Saruman used his influence through the traitor Grima Wormtongue to weaken Théoden. Saruman then launched an invasion of Rohan, with victory in early battles at the Fords of Isen, killing Théoden's son, Théodred. Saruman was defeated at the Battle of the Hornburg, where the tree-like Huorns came from the forest of Fangorn to help the Rohirrim.

Théoden then rode with his army to Minas Tirith, helping to break its siege in the Battle of the Pelennor Fields and killing the leader of the Haradrim, but was killed when his horse fell. He was succeeded by his nephew Éomer. His niece Éowyn and the hobbit Merry Brandybuck killed the Lord of the Nazgûl.

Éomer rode with the armies of Gondor to the Black Gate of Mordor and took part in the Battle of the Morannon against the forces of Sauron. At this time, the destruction of the Ruling Ring in Mount Doom ended the battle and the war. Éowyn married Faramir, Prince of Ithilien.

Analysis

The critic Jane Chance writes that Théoden is transformed by Gandalf into a good bold "Germanic king"; she contrasts this with the failure of "the proud Beorhtnoth" in the Old English poem The Battle of Maldon. In her view, in the account of the battle of Helm's Deep, the fortress of the Riddermark, Tolkien is emphasising the Rohirrim's physical prowess.

The critic Tom Shippey notes that the Riders of Rohan are, despite Tolkien's protestations, much like the ancient English (the Anglo-Saxons), but that they differed from the ancient English in having a culture based on horses. They use many Old English words related to horses; their name for themselves is Éotheod, horse-people, and the names of riders like Éomund, Éomer, and Éowyn begin with the word for "horse", eo[h]. In Shippey's view, a defining virtue of the Riders is panache, which he explains means both "the white horsetail on [Éomer's] helm floating in his speed" and "the virtue of sudden onset, the dash that sweeps away resistance." Shippey notes that this allows Tolkien to display Rohan both as English, based on their Old English names and words like éored ("troop of cavalry"), and as "alien, to offer a glimpse of the way land shapes people". 
Shippey states further that "the Mark" (or the Riddermark), the land of the Riders of Rohan – all of whom have names in the Mercian dialect of Old English, was once the usual term for central England, and it would have been pronounced and written "marc" rather than the West Saxon "mearc" or the Latinized "Mercia".

The Tolkien scholar Thomas Honegger, agreeing with Shippey's description of the Rohirrim as "Anglo-Saxons on Horseback", calls the sources for them "quite obvious to anyone familiar with Anglo-Saxon literature and culture". The resemblances, according to Honegger, include masterly horsemanship, embodying the Old English saying Éorl sceal on éos boge, éored sceal getrume rídan ("The leader shall on horse's back, warband shall ride in a body"). The Riders are a Germanic warrior-society, exemplifying the "northern heroic spirit", like the Anglo-Saxons. But the "crucial" fact is the language; Honegger notes that Tolkien had represented Westron speech as modern English; since Rohan spoke a related but older language, Old English was the natural choice in the same style; Tolkien's 1942 table of correspondences also showed that the language of the people of Dale was represented by Norse. Honegger notes that this does not equate the Rohirrim with the Anglo-Saxons (on horseback or not), but it does show a strong connection, making them "the people most dear to Tolkien and all medievalists."

Jane Ciabattari writes on BBC Culture that Lady Éowyn's fear of being caged rather than "doing great deeds" by riding to battle with the Rohirrim resonated with 1960s feminists, contributing to the success of Lord of the Rings at that time.

Portrayal in adaptations

For Peter Jackson's The Lord of the Rings film trilogy, the Poolburn Reservoir in Central Otago, New Zealand was used for Rohan scenes. The theme for Rohan is played on a Hardanger fiddle. A fully realised set for Edoras was built on Mount Sunday in the upper reaches of the Rangitata Valley, near Erewhon in New Zealand. Some of the set was built digitally, but the main buildings atop the city were built on location; the mountain ranges in the background were part of the actual location shot. The interiors of buildings such as the Golden Hall, however, were located on soundstages in other parts of New Zealand; when the camera is inside of the Golden Hall, looking out the open gates, the image of the on-set Edoras set is digitally inserted into the door-frame. The site was known among the cast and crew for being extremely windy, as can be seen during the film and DVD interviews. After filming, Mount Sunday was returned to its original state.

Notes

References

Primary
This list identifies each item's location in Tolkien's writings.

Secondary

Sources 

 
  
 
 

 
 
 
 
 
  
 
  
 
 
  reprinted in Hammond, Wayne G.; Scull, Christina (2005), The Lord of the Rings: A Reader's Companion, HarperCollins, .
 
 
 

Fictional elements introduced in 1954
Middle-earth realms
Fictional kingdoms